John J. Rowan (September 6, 1919 – October 6, 2012) was a captain in the United States Navy.

Military career

World War II
Rowan graduated from the United States Naval Academy in December 1941. His first tour of duty as a newly commissioned ensign was aboard the heavy cruiser . He later received a citation for his participation on the Vincennes during the Doolittle Raid. When the ship was sunk in the first Battle of Savo Island, Ensign Rowan, with only a life jacket, waited five hours in the water until rescued.

Eight weeks after his assignment to the De Haven, it was sunk in the second Battle of Savo Island. Ensign Rowan sustained injuries and was in the water for two hours until rescued by a Landing craft tank which the ship had been escorting.

After the second rescue, he spent the next seven months recuperating from injuries in the San Diego Naval Hospital. While recuperating, he met and married Miss Mary Thompson (Durham, North Carolina), who was working at the hospital.

Post-World War II
After attending postgraduate school in communications at the United States Naval Academy in Annapolis in 1948, Rowan was assigned to duty on the staff of ComCruDesPac in 1949 as communications officer and in 1952 to NavCommFac, London, as executive officer. He was awarded the Legion of Merit for his participation in planning the move of U.S. Communications Systems from France to Germany. Two years later, he reported to the superintendent of the U. S. Naval Academy for duty as assistant chief of staff for personnel and administration.

Vietnam War
In April 1961, after twelve months as executive officer of the Newport News, Rowan was assigned to duty in Washington, D.C., with the Director of Naval Communications, where he served successively as director of the Plans and Policy Division; followed by officer in charge, Naval Communications Systems, Headquarters Activity; and then as director of the Program Division.

In September 1963, Rowan was hand picked as the prospective commanding officer of the Navy's first Communication Major Relay Ship .  He served in this position until the ship's commissioning in March 1964.  At that time, Rowan became the first commanding officer of the Annapolis and served in that position until April 1965, when he was relieved by Captain John Newland. As the first commanding officer of the USS Annapolis, the ship has the distinction because of his direct involvement and planning for the first "floating communications" station and first ship to transmit messages ship-to-shore via satellite.

Retirement and death
Captain Rowan resided in Springfield, Virginia, Pinehurst, North Carolina, and Williamsburg, Virginia, with his wife Mary until his death on October 6, 2012.  He received a burial with full honors in Arlington National Cemetery on October 18, 2012.

Military awards and decorations

References

Notes

1919 births
2012 deaths
United States Navy officers
United States Navy personnel of the Korean War
United States Navy personnel of the Vietnam War
United States Navy personnel of World War II
Recipients of the Legion of Merit
United States Naval Academy alumni
People from Saint Paul, Minnesota
Military personnel from Minnesota